The following radio stations broadcast on AM frequency 840 kHz: WHAS in Louisville is the dominant Class A station on 840 AM, which is a United States clear channel frequency.

In Argentina 
 General Belgrano in Buenos Aires
 LT12 Gral Madariaga in Paso de los Libres, Corrientes
 LU2 in Bahia Blanca, Buenos Aires
 LV9 in Salta

In Canada

In Mexico 
 XETEY-AM in Tepic, Nayarit
 XEXXX-AM in Tamazula de Gordiano, Jalisco

In the United States 
Stations in bold are clear-channel stations.

References

Lists of radio stations by frequency